A-League Women, known as the W-League before the 2021–22 season, is an association football competition organised by Football Australia. It is the highest level of women's club football in Australia. The competition is held between 11 teams from across Australia and one in New Zealand. The competition takes the form of a number of "regular season" matches between all teams, after which the top four contest semi-finals in order to qualify for the Grand Final, to play for the title of A-League Women Champions at the home ground of the higher-ranked team over the regular season. The first W-League Grand Final was won by Queensland Roar, who beat Canberra United 2–0.

Melbourne City have won a record four Championships and are the only A-League Women team to have won 3 championships back-to-back. Sydney have been runners-up more than any other team, having lost in the Grand Final six times. Melbourne Victory are the current Champions, having beaten Sydney 2–1 in the 2022 Grand Final.

History
The winners of the first tournament were Queensland Roar (who were later to change their name to "Brisbane Roar"), after finishing at the top of the table over the regular season ("Premiers"). The Roar made all but two of the first seven W-League grand finals. In the 14 A-League Women seasons to date (including the 13 played under the original W-League branding), the Premiers have only gone on to win the Grand Final four times. The 2015 Grand Final was the first to feature neither the Roar nor Sydney FC.

The home side has lost the Grand Final on four occasions. Sydney FC and Melbourne Victory are the only sides to have hosted the Final more than once; both have won once at their home ground, with Sydney having lost twice and Melbourne Victory once.

Between 2012 and 2014, the W-League Champions were invited to play in the International Women's Club Championship.

Finals

Key

Results

Results by team

See also

List of Australian soccer champions
A-League Men Grand Final
AFL Women's Grand Final
NRL Women's Grand Final
WNBL Grand Final

Notes
A.  Attendance refers to the number of people present during that year's final.
B.  2020 Grand Final was played behind closed doors due to the COVID-19 pandemic.
C.  Brisbane Roar's total includes one win under the earlier name of Queensland Roar.

References

External links
A-League Women official website

 
A-League Women lists